Far Away is a 1995 EP released to introduce the then upcoming album Moving Target by the Danish progressive metal band Royal Hunt. The instrumental "Double Conversion" appears only on this release. The live tracks were recorded in Japan in 1995 during the "Clown in the Mirror" tour. Royal Hunt dedicated the song "Far Away" to all the people of Japan who lost their relatives and friends in the 1995 Great Hanshin earthquake.

Track listing
All songs written by André Andersen.
 "Far Away" – 4:59
 "Double Conversion" (Instrumental) – 4:18
 "Intro/Wasted Time" (Live) – 6:29
 "Flight" (Live) – 4:37
 "Stranded" (Live) – 4:55
 "Epilogue" (Live) – 7:37

Personnel
D. C. Cooper – lead and backing vocals
André Andersen – keyboards and guitars
Jacob Kjaer - guitars
Steen Mogensen – bass guitar
Kenneth Olsen – drums

External links
Metal Archives page

Royal Hunt albums
1995 EPs